Magelona is a genus of annelids belonging to the family Magelonidae.

The genus has cosmopolitan distribution.

Species

Species:

Magelona agoensis 
Magelona alexandrae 
Magelona alleni 
Magelona dakini

References

Annelids